Trushniki is a rural locality (a selo) and the administrative center of Trushnikovskoye Rural Settlement, Chernushinsky District, Perm Krai, Russia. The population was 605 as of 2010. There are 6 streets.

Geography 
Trushniki is located 18 km south of Chernushka (the district's administrative centre) by road. Nikolayevsky is the nearest rural locality.

References 

Rural localities in Chernushinsky District